is a railway station in the city of Tōkamachi, Niigata, Japan operated by East Japan Railway Company (JR East).

Lines
Doichi Station is served by the Iiyama Line, and is 70.4 kilometers from the starting point of the line at Toyono Station.

Station layout
The station consists of a single side platform serving one bi-directional track. The station is unattended.

History
Doichi Station opened on 1 September 1929. With the privatization of Japanese National Railways (JNR) on 1 April 1987, the station came under the control of JR East. A new station building was completed in 2000.

Surrounding area

Doichi Post Office

See also
 List of railway stations in Japan

External links

 JR East station information 

Railway stations in Niigata Prefecture
Railway stations in Japan opened in 1929
Iiyama Line
Tōkamachi, Niigata